Kunturini (Aymara kunturi condor,  -ni a suffix to indicate ownership, "the one with a condor", also spelled Condorini) is a mountain east of the Apolobamba mountain range in Bolivia, about  high. It is situated in the La Paz Department, Bautista Saavedra Province, Curva Municipality.

References 

Mountains of La Paz Department (Bolivia)